Chromosome 21 is a Chilean crime thriller television series co-created by Matías Venables and Nico Martínez Bergen. The series traces a police investigation into a young man with down syndrome involved in a murder. It had its original run on Chilean network Canal 13 on 14 October 2022. Netflix then acquired global streaming rights, and released it on their platform on 8 February 2023. The series received four nominations at the 7th Caleuche Awards, with Sebastián Solorza winning the breakthrough actor award, and five nominations for the 10th Platino Awards.

Plot

Cast

Main 

 Sebastián Solorza as Tomás "Tomy" Ruiz: a young man with down syndrome who becomes involved in a crime because of his brother
 Valentina Muhr as Mariana Enríquez: the commissioner of the homicide brigade of the Investigations Police of Chile (PDI)
 Mario Horton as Bruno Durán: the deputy commissioner of the homicide brigade
 Gastón Salgado as Guillermo "Bekam" Ruiz: Tomy's younger brother
 Claudia di Girolamo as Sofía Lombardi: the director of the "Down Up Foundation" and Cristina's mother
 Pía Urrutia as Cristina Pérez: Sofía's daughter and Tomy's fiancée with down syndrome
 Daniel Muñoz as Ariel "Coya" Zavala: a former Carabinero who owns the factory where the murder occurred
 Alejandro Trejo as Rafael Santoro, PDI subprefect; Enríquez and Durán's boss

Production 
The series was originally meant to tell the story of a 42-year-old nurse who finds out she is pregnant with a baby with down syndrome, and received a  grant for it from the National Television Council. Filming took place in Santiago and began on 27 September 2021.

Awards and nominations

References

External links 
  
 

Television shows based on books
Police procedural television series
Chilean drama television series
Thriller television series
Television shows set in Santiago
Spanish-language television shows
Spanish-language Netflix original programming
2022 Chilean television series debuts
2020s Chilean television series